Jean-François Charbonnier (18 January 1959 – 7 December 2020) was a French footballer who played as a defender and as a midfielder.

Honours
Paris Saint-Germain

 French Division 1: 1985–86
 Coupe de France runner-up: 1984–85

References

1959 births
2020 deaths
Footballers from Lyon
French footballers
Association football defenders
Association football midfielders
AS Saint-Priest players
Stade de Reims players
Paris Saint-Germain F.C. players
AS Cannes players
Paris FC players
Paris FC managers
Championnat National players
Ligue 1 players
Ligue 2 players